Joe Loram John Neal (born 22 October 2000) is an English footballer who plays for  side Biggleswade Town, where he plays as a forward.

Playing career

Cambridge United
Neal joined the Cambridge United Academy in 2008 and signed his first two-and-half-year professional contract in February 2019. He was handed the contract after impressing on loan at Southern League Premier Division Central side Royston Town the previous month. He made his debut in first-team football on 19 January, in a 1–0 defeat at Kettering Town and scored a brace on his home debut three days later in a 4–4 draw with Lowestoft Town. In total he scored three goals in 18 games for Steve Castle's "Crows".

He began the 2019–20 season on loan at Needham Market, having scored a brace for the club in a pre-season friendly. He went on to score five goals in 29 appearances for Richard Wilkins's "Marketmen". He played four games on loan at St Neots Town in January 2020; "Saints" manager Barry Corr said that "I expect him to score goals".

He was loaned out to Biggleswade Town and scored a hat-trick in a 7–4 win over Leiston on 29 September 2020. He was recalled to Cambridge after the 2020–21 season was cancelled at Southern League level due to the COVID-19 pandemic in England, having scored five goals in ten games for 	Chris Nunn's "Waders". He made his first-team debut for Cambridge on 10 November 2020, coming on as a 79th-minute substitute for Harvey Knibbs in a 1–1 draw with Peterborough United in an EFL Trophy game at the Abbey Stadium; Cambridge went on to lose the penalty shoot-out 3–1.

On 17 May 2021, Cambridge United announced they would not be offering Neal a new contract.

Biggleswade Town
Neal signed permanently for Biggleswade Town on 2 August 2021.

St Albans City
Neal signed permanently for St Albans City F.C. on 15 February 2022.

Style of play
Neal is a free-kick specialist.

Statistics

References

External links

2000 births
Living people
People from Newmarket, Suffolk
English footballers
Association football forwards
Cambridge United F.C. players
Royston Town F.C. players
Needham Market F.C. players
St Neots Town F.C. players
Biggleswade Town F.C. players
Southern Football League players
English Football League players